InnoGames GmbH is a German video game developer based in Hamburg. Founded in 2007, it focuses on the development of browser and mobile games. The company now has millions of registered players and revenues that reached  in 2019.

History
In 2003, founders Eike and Hendrik Klindworth and Michael Zillmer created and released the browser-based online game Tribal Wars as a hobby project. By 2005, the game had tens of thousands of players. Due to the success, the three founders decided to work full-time on the development and publishing of browser games. Then in early 2007, InnoGames was founded to handle the operation and continued development of the Tribal Wars. Since then, the company has developed new games and publishes their games worldwide. As of the beginning of 2019, the company has seven live games.

The company released its second game, The West, in 2008. That same year InnoGames moved to Harburg, Hamburg and hired additional employees. As the company continued to grow, they released their third game, Grepolis, in 2009. Since 2013, Grepolis is playable as an app for iOS and Android devices. Its first city-builder, Forge of Empires, was published in 2012. The game includes a journey through time that begins in the Stone Age and guides the player through the ages of human history. As of mid 2021, the latest playable era is the Space Age: Venus, but further extensions are planned, with the next era being Space Age: Jupiter Moon. Four cultural settlements have also been introduced: Vikings, Feudal Japan, Azteks and Ancient Egypt, adding even more content.

Forge of Empires was awarded the German Computer Game Prize in 2013 as the best browser game. Since 5 June 2014 the game is also playable as an app on the iPad. The iPhone version followed in September 2014  and the Android version on 25 March 2015. In 2014, Tribal Wars 2 joins the InnoGames portfolio. Following Forge of Empires' Android version in 2015, the German developer published its second city-building MMO, Elvenar in April. In November 2019, InnoGames surpassed the EUR 1 billion lifetime revenue milestone. Live operations, ongoing content updates and mobile greatly contributed to the company's continued success, having experienced growth each year since its founding.

Further growth
In May 2010, the investor Fidelity Growth Partners Europe (FGPE) joined InnoGames with a minority share. Also in 2010, former Electronic Arts executive Gerhard Florin joined InnoGames as chairman. By 2016, MTG (Modern Times Group) acquired 35% of the German free-to-play developer. 2016 was also InnoGames' most successful year, having a 68% year-on-year growth. The following year, InnoGames acquired Wooga's strategy game Warlords, promising a relaunch of the game. Later, on 2 May 2017 the Swedish Company MTG increased its stake in InnoGames by buying 51% of the company. As of July 2018, the company employs 420 people.

Mobile initiative
The first title that the company launched on mobile platforms was Tribal Wars, its founding game. Grepolis, another of its strategy browser titles, was also launched onto mobile platforms in 2013. On 2014, Forge of Empires was also converted to be played on a tablet and increased the company's revenues.

InnoGames managed to transition from browser to mobile, even as other studios have faltered. The company now has four studios which develop and maintain their strategy games. Despite focusing on mobile, their CEO has said that the company will continue developing and maintaining browser games in the future

Communities and languages
InnoGames is known for establishing dedicated communities in a plethora of languages. All the games are available in over 20 languages, and support to the players is provided not only through a support system, but also in forums. At the communities disposal, InnoGames count with Community Managers (and moderation teams), which engage, collect feedback and provide support to the players.

Games developed

Awards 
The games Tribal Wars, The West, Grepolis, Forge of Empires and Seven Lands have received several awards and nominations.

Forge of Empires:
 2012 – Nomination for the European Games Award in the category Best European Browser Game
 2012 – Nomination at the German Developer Prize for the Developer Game of the Year in the categories Best Game Design and Best Browser Game
 2013 – Winner of the German Computer Games Prize in the category Best Browser Game
 2013 – Winner of the “MMO of the Year”-Award in the category Best Strategy Browser MMO
 2019 – Nomination at the German Developer Prize in the category "Evergreen" 

Grepolis:
 2009 – Nomination in the category Best Strategy Game and Best German Browser game 2009 at the German Developer Prize
 2010 – Nomination for the Bäm! Computec Games Award in the category Online- or Browser Game
 2011 – Nomination in the category Best Browser Game at the European Games Awards
 2012 – Winner of the "MMO of the Year, Jury-Award" in the category Best Classic Browser MMO
 2013 – Nomination for "MMO of the Year" in the category Best Classic Browser MMO

Die Stämme:
 2006 – Audience Award "Browser Game of the Year" from the Website galaxynews in the category Fun
 2010/2011 – Nomination for den Browser Game of the Year – Audience Award in the category Best Game Expansion

Seven Lands:
 2011 – “MMO of the Year”-Award in the category "Role Playing Games"

References

External links
 

Browser-based game websites
Companies based in Hamburg
Video game companies of Germany
Video game development companies
Video game companies established in 2007
German companies established in 2007